Eucalyptus × tetragona and Eucalyptus tetragona are listed as synonyms of Eucalyptus pleurocarpa at the Australian Plant Census.

Entries in earlier texts The Western Australian Flora, Eucalypts of the Western Australian goldfields (and the adjacent wheatbelt) and Flora of Australia have the earlier assumption of the separate non-hybrid form.

References

Hybrid plants
tetragona
Myrtales of Australia
Eucalypts of Western Australia
Historically recognized angiosperm taxa
Taxa named by Robert Brown (botanist, born 1773)